The third series of Renminbi banknotes was introduced since April 15, 1962. Unlike the second series of the renminbi, it did not have a ¥3 banknote and added ¥0.1, ¥0.2, ¥0.5 and ¥1 coins. For the next two decades, the second and third series banknotes were used concurrently. The third series was phased out over the 1990s and then was recalled completely on July 1, 2000, a date valid for all of the denominations with only one date provided.

Date of issue
April 20, 1962: ¥0.1 (1960 edition) banknote.
April 15, 1964: ¥2 and ¥0.2 banknotes.
January 10, 1966: ¥10 and ¥0.1 (1962 edition) banknotes.
December 15, 1967: ¥0.1 (1962 colour-changing edition) banknote.
October 20, 1969: ¥1 and ¥5 banknotes.
January 5, 1974: ¥0.5 banknote.
April 5, 1980: ¥0.1, ¥0.2, ¥0.5 and ¥1 coins.

Coins

Banknotes

The denominations available with either of these catalog number (issued date-withdrawn date) added: 
¥0.1 3|1(20/4/1962-20/11/1971), 3|2(31/10/1966-15/12/1967) 3|3(15/12/1967-4/2/1992), 
¥0.2 (15/4/1964-4/2/1992), 
¥0.5 (5/1/1974-1/3/1991), 
¥1 (20/10/1969-1/3/1996), 
¥2 (15/4/1964-1/3/1991), 
¥5 (20/10/1969-4/2/1992),
¥10 (10/1/1966-1/3/1996).

References

Coins of China
Banknotes of China
Renminbi
Currencies introduced in 1962
Chinese numismatics